The Central Cardamom Mountains National Park is a protected area in the central parts of Cambodia's Cardamom Mountains, covering . It was established in 1999 as a protected forest under management by the Forestry Administration, and in 2016 the Ministry of Environment assumed responsibility.

The Central Cardamom Mountains National Park spans three provinces and is flanked east and west by Phnom Aural Wildlife Sanctuary and Phnom Samkos Wildlife Sanctuary respectively.

References

External links 

Cambodia’s Central Cardamom Mountains National Park

Geography of Koh Kong province
Geography of Pursat province
Protected areas of Cambodia
Cardamom Mountains
Geography of Kampong Speu province
Forests of Cambodia